Xu Zhaoji (born 9 March 1998) is a Chinese footballer currently playing as a midfielder for Shaanxi Chang'an Athletic.

Career statistics

Club
.

References

1998 births
Living people
Chinese footballers
Association football midfielders
China League Two players
China League One players
Shenyang Dongjin F.C. players
Suzhou Dongwu F.C. players
Shaanxi Chang'an Athletic F.C. players
21st-century Chinese people